Steven J. Pollock is an American professor of physics and a President's Teaching Scholar at the University of Colorado Boulder, where he has taught since 1993. His specialisations are in physics education research and in nuclear theory. He is the 2013 U.S. Professor of the Year.

Early life and education
Pollock sat for an Sc.B. in physics at the Massachusetts Institute of Technology in 1982 and for an M.S. and Ph.D. in physics at Stanford University respectively in 1984 and 1987 for his thesis, entitled Electroweak Interactions in the Nuclear Domain, under Professor John Dirk Walecka.

Career
He was a postdoctoral fellow in nuclear physics at the Nationaal instituut voor subatomaire fysica (NIKHEF), Amsterdam, from 1988 to 1990, and at the University of Washington's Institute for Nuclear Theory from 1990 to 1992.  In 1993 he became a senior scientist at NIKHEF before joining the University of Colorado at Boulder as an assistant professor, where he was promoted to associate professor in 2000 and to full professor in 2009.  In the early aughts (2000s) he shifted his primary focus to physics education research. In 2003 he co-founded the learning assistant programme.

Research
Pollock investigates and develops curricular and pedagogical reforms and assessments in upper-division physics courses.  He investigates impacts of established reforms in large lecture introductory courses, including the use of "Tutorials in introductory physics", with graduate TA training, and use of undergraduate learning assistants. He has advised four graduate students and eight postdoctoral fellows in nuclear physics and in physics education research.

Bibliography

Books

 Particle Physics for Non-physicists: a Tour of the Microcosmos (2003). The Teaching Company. .
 Physics 1 (2001). Thinkwell. ASIN 1605380261.
 Great Ideas of Classical Physics (2006). The Teaching Company. .

See also
American Association of Physics Teachers
Carnegie Foundation for the Advancement of Teaching
Learning Assistant Model
Nuclear physics
Physics education research
Science education

References

External links
Steven Pollock faculty homepage
Steven Pollock's website at University of Colorado Boulder
PER group homepage
Steven Pollock on Google Scholar

MIT Department of Physics alumni
Stanford University alumni
University of Colorado faculty
Place of birth missing (living people)
Year of birth missing (living people)
University of Colorado Boulder faculty
Living people
21st-century American physicists
American educational theorists
Fellows of the American Physical Society